Major Sir James Rennie Maudslay,  (13 August 1915 – 8 June 1988) was a British Army officer and courtier in the Household of Queen Elizabeth II.

Maudslay served in the Second World War as an officer in the King's Royal Rifle Corps, and was made a Member of the Order of the British Empire on 20 September 1945 for his wartime services. He relinquished his commission in the army on 13 August 1965. Between 1971 and 1981 he worked as Keeper of the Privy Purse, the financial manager of the Royal Household. He was also Secretary of the Royal Victorian Order from 1971 to 1987. On 1 January 1973 Maudslay was appointed an Extra Equerry to Elizabeth II. He was made a Knight Commander of the Order of the Bath in the 1979 New Year Honours.

In a letter from Prince Philip, Duke of Edinburgh to Maudslay in 1970, the Prince described him as a "silly little Whitehall twit".

Between 1970 and 1979 he lived at Frensham Vale House, near Farnham, Surrey.

References

1915 births
1988 deaths
British Army personnel of World War II
Equerries
King's Royal Rifle Corps officers
Knights Commander of the Order of the Bath
Knights Grand Cross of the Royal Victorian Order
Members of the British Royal Household
Members of the Order of the British Empire